Hajongard cemetery (officially Central Cemetery, in Hungarian Házsongárdi temető, from German Hasengarten), on Avram Iancu Street, is one of the oldest cemeteries in Cluj-Napoca, Romania, founded in the sixteenth century. It is one of the most picturesque sights of the city.

Notable interments 
 Ion Agârbiceanu (1882–1963), writer, journalist, politician, academician and archpriest
 János Apáczai Csere (1625–1659), humanist scholar
 Gheorghe Avramescu (1884–1945), Lieutenant General during World War II
 Miklós Bánffy (1873–1950), writer, illustrator, scenographer and foreign minister of Hungary
 Matei Boilă (1926–2015), politician and priest 
 Sámuel Brassai (1797–1897), linguist and teacher
 Nicolae Bretan (1887–1968), opera composer, baritone, conductor, and music critic
 Constantin Daicoviciu (1898–1973), historian, archaeologist, professor, and communist politician
 Aurel Ciupe (1900–1985), painter
 Doina Cornea (1929–2018), human rights activist and French language professor
  (1847–1925), composer, conductor, and teacher
 Iuliu Hațieganu (1885–1959), physician
 Jenő Janovics (1872–1945), actor, scenarist, and director
 Aureliu Manea (1945–2014), theatre director, actor, and writer
  (1921–2005), essayist, critic, historian, and literary theorist
 Lajos Martin (1827–1897), mathematician and engineer
 Imre Mikó (1805–1876), governor of Transylvania
 John Paget (1808–1892), English agriculturist and author on Hungary
 Tiberiu Popoviciu (1906–1975), mathematician
 Emil Racoviță (1868–1947), savant, explorer, and founder of biospeleology
 Raluca Ripan (1894–1972), chemist

External links
 

Cemeteries in Romania
Tourist attractions in Cluj-Napoca